is a Japanese tarento, presenter, actor, and comedian.

He is represented with Watanabe Entertainment. He dropped out from Tsunamu Elementary School, North Junior High School (up to two semesters for three years), Persimmon Junior High School (only three semesters for three years), Kakiyo High School, and Kurume High School.

Biography
He planned to quit if he could debut in three months while aiming to become an actor, he joined the Tokyo Children's Theatre Company "N.A.C" in 1981. Just three months later, he debut of the entertainment world with the semi-protagonist of Kayō Suspense Gekijō's Nerawareta Jokyōshi (20 April 1982, Nippon TV). Depending on his drama debut, he could not keep down his feelings and went to high school in the suburbs of Tokyo, he jumped out of Gunma and transferred from junior high school third term to junior high school in Kawasaki, Kanagawa. He passed the recruitment audition of Watanabe Productions in January 1984 while having them stayed in a house of acquaintances or school teachers.

In the same year, they debuted in Fuji Television's Lion no Itadakimasu as assistants. They were popular mainly in young women in their appearances including Nippon Broadcasting System's AB Brothers no All Night Nippon (October 1985 - July 1987). However, their popularity declined after when they appeared in Itadakimasu in 1989. After that, he shifted to his work of acting and moderating by himself, in contrast to the direction with Matsuno seeking to be a comedical talent became prominent. In 1992, their activities as AB Brothers disappears spontaneously, as it is pursued by a third generation of comedy. Later on, Matsuno wrote the autobiographical novel Geinin Shikkaku (published by Gentosha) with motifs of his relationship with Zhongshan during his time.

He later participated in popular television dramas such as Fuji Television's Tokyo Love Story in 1991 and Tokyo Broadcasting System's Depart! Natsu Monogatari as a supporting character. Also, since 1992, he made regular appearances on Nippon TV's Daisuki! His light talks with Akiko Matsumoto and Naoko Iijima gathered support from viewers. Also, in 1994, he became a topic such as his relationship with former Onyanko Club member Yukiko Iwai. On the other hand, Nancy Seki said, "A star of bullfighting variety show scenes gave birth to a star who is watching TV. It's smooth with only the (entertainment industry) sharpness, relationships, and other circumstances which has nothing to do with me; Hideyuki Nakayama is a symbol of this in the inside of a cathode ray tube that is turning to." according to a column.

Fuji Television's Uchikuri!? started in a combination with Ai Iijima in a form that almost exchanges with the end of Daisuki! (in the combination with Junko Kubo and then Shoko Nakagawa after Iijima retired), in the fall of 2005 Japan he was in charge of the main chair on NTV's Rajikaru!!, and it was decided to have a weekday band programme for the first time in Kanto Local (there were no broadcasts on Fridays). There are also performances of young artists such as Taka and Toshi, The Tachi, etc. in the free atmosphere of casts including Nakayama, and growing into a popular programme that hits high viewership ratings in the evening. In the spring of the following year, the show moved to the frame earlier in the morning by titling Rajikaru''', and the audience rating exceeded ten percent.

From 30 March 2009, he took over Rajikaru' and Omoikkiriī!! TV, and became the general chairperson of the integrated new programme Omoikkiri Don!, and became the face of lunchtime on Nippon TV replacing Monta Mino. In the fall of the same year, he was going to concentrate on the comprehensive host of the second division to Bibiru Ōki and Keisuke Okada (of Masuda Okada) who will chair with the first division moderator in the reorganization of the same year. Omoikkiri Don! ended on 26 March 2010, and was renewed to Don! since 29 March of the same year. When Don! ended on 25 March 2011, he was appointed as moderator for Shuichi on Sunday morning 8 to 9 am on Sunday mornings that began broadcasting on 3 April of the same year.

He served as "Ambassador Gunma" serving as PR of Gunma Prefecture together with tarento Miyuki Imori who is also from Gumma Prefecture the same as Nakayama.

He won the 30th Best Father Yellow Ribbon Award for Entertainment Category. Also, his wife played the role of the top daughter of the former Takarazuka Revue Company, and so on, there are exchanges between her Takaragenne career and her public and private life. In 2007, he played with Tsubasa Makoto in the stage show Show Mise-gai Kumikyoku, Haruhi Ryoga appearing as a guest on Time Shock  broadcast on 17 September 2014, etc., which made Takaragenne members often appearing as guests on his regular programmes. He also hosted NHK-BS Premium's Takarazuka Revue: Kareinaru 100-nen -Star ga Kataru Yume no Sekai-'' broadcast on 19 June 2014.

Filmography

Television

Currently appearing programmes
 Regular programmes

 Special shows

Former appearances
 Regular programmes

 Special shows

Radio

Currently appearing programmes

Former appearances

TV dramas

Films

Direct-to-video

Anime films

Discography

Singles
 7 inch EP

8 cm CD

Albums

See also
Monta Mino – Predecessor of the Omoikkiri series

References

External links
 

Japanese television personalities
Japanese television presenters
Japanese male actors
Japanese radio personalities
People from Gunma Prefecture
1967 births
Living people